Stylissa flabelliformis, known as the orange fan sponge, is found throughout the tropical oceans. It is usually shaped liked a Japanese fan hence its name. It feeds on plankton. In the wild it prefers to grow on rocky shelves. It is sometime but not often kept by hobby aquarists.

References

External links
Stylissa flabelliformis info

Sponges described in 1912
Halichondrida